The men's long jump at the 2017 World Championships in Athletics was held at the Olympic Stadium on .

Summary
In the final Jarrion Lawson took the lead with 8.37 metres on the fourth jump of the competition. Rushwahl Samaai jumped 8.25 metres on the next jump and the closest to Lawson was 2013 champion Aleksandr Menkov with 8.27 metres. But Menkov would not get in another legal jump. On the second jump of the second round Luvo Manyonga jumped 8.48 metres. Lawson jumped 8.43 metres two jumps later, 8.40 metres in the third round and 8.44 metres in the final round but couldn't reach Manyonga. Samaai jumped 8.27 metres in the fifth round to get the tiebreak edge on the bronze and solidified it with an 8.32 metres in the final round.

Records
Before the competition records were as follows:

No records were set at the competition.

Qualification standard
The standard to qualify automatically for entry was 8.15 metres.

Schedule
The event schedule, in local time (UTC+1), was as follows:

Results

Qualification
The qualification round took place on 4 August, in two groups, both starting at 19:30. Athletes attaining a mark of at least 8.05 metres ( Q ) or at least the 12 best performers ( q ) qualified for the final. The overall results were as follows:

Final
The final took place on 5 August at 20:05. The results were as follows:

References

Long jump
Long jump at the World Athletics Championships